Angamali Diocese is the largest of the 12 dioceses of Syrian Orthodox Church in Kerala. Angamali Diocese was formed in the historic synod of Mulanthuruthy in 1876 and has been the major center of Jacobites through the ages. 
Metropolitan of the Diocese is HB Baselios Thomas I Catholicose.

Regions
Angamali Diocese is divided into five regions for administrative purposes under different bishops.

Angamaly
Metropolitan- Mor Severios Abraham

Headquarters-Thrikkunnath seminary Aluva

Parent parish-St. Mary's Cathedral, Angamaly

This region consists of 52 parishes, including St Thomas Church North Paravur (tomb of St Gregorios Abdul Jaleel), Thamarachal Valiyapally-Marian pilgrim centre, Angamaly St Mary's Sonoro Cathedral, Pallikkara Malecruz St Thomas Church- Global St Thomas Pilgrim Centre.

Perumbavoor
Metropolitan- Mor Aphrem Mathews

Headquarters- Koinonia, Vengola

Parent Parish- St. Mary's Cathedral, Kurupampady (Largest Parish in Malankara-2000 families)

The region has 43 parishes, including Mazhuvanoor St Thomas Cathedral, Kurupampady St. Mary's Cathedral, Vengoor Mar Kauma Church, Thuruthiply St Mary's Church.

Kothamangalam
Metropolitan-Mor Yulios Elias

Headquarters - Catholicate Aramana- Mount Sinai, Kothamangalam

Parent Parish- Martha Mariyam Cathedral(Valiyapally), Kothmangalam

This region is called the Stronghold of Jacobites with 48 churches and most of them big parishes, including Martha Mariyam Cathedral Kothamangalam (Valiyapally) established in AD 456, Mar Thoma Cheriayapally Kothmangalam (tomb of St Baselious Yeldho), Chelad Bes Aniya Valiyapally, Kottapady Kalkunnel church, and Kottapady Nagancherry church.

Highrange (Adimali)
Metropolitan-Mor Yulios Elias

Headquarters-Metropolitan aramana Adimali

Parent parish- St George Cathedral, Adimali

This is the largest region in terms of area as it covers regions of Angamali diocese falling in Idukki district. There are 34 parishes in the region. Major parishes are St. George Cathedral Adimali, Koompanpara St. George Church, 14th mile Ignatius Noorono Church.

Muvattupuzha
Metropolitan- Mor Anthimos Mathews

Headquarters- Muvattupuzha aramana

Parent parish- St. Mary's Cathedral, Karakunnam

This region has 37 parishes, including St. Mary's Cathedral Karakkunnam, Rakkad Cathedral, and Kadathy St. Peter's and St. Paul's church.
St. Mary's Jacobite Syrian church Mullaringadu

Sunday School
The 257 Sunday schools in the diocese are divided into three zones and 23 districts.

Region-wise
Angamali Region- 62
Perumbavoor Region- 59
Kothamangalam Region- 57
Muvattupuzha Region- 40
Highrange Region- 39

Zone-wise
West Zone- 88
Central Zone- 86
East Zone- 83

Jacobite Syrian Orthodox Youth Association 
This is the youth wing of Jacobite Syrian church.
Diocese Secretary: Paul Kooran

Mor Gregorios Jacobite Students Movement
Mor Gregorios Jacobite Students Movement is the student wing of Jacobite church started in 1922 at Cheruthottukunnel St. George church in Angamali Region of Angamali Diocese by St. Athanasius of Aluva. MGJSM in Angamali Diocese is divided into six regions
 Spiritual Director: Rev Fr George Vayaliparambil 
 Diocesan Coordinator: Shinil Thuruthummel
 Committee Members
 Godly
 Jinson
 Eldho Madathumpady
 Eldho Karukapilly
 Maria Paul
 Aby Mathew
 Joseph Peter
 Fima Joy
 Ebin Eldho
 Belby Benny
 Albin Aleyas
 Ankith Sabu
 Leeba Benny
 Jobin
 Boney

Prelates

Statistics
Parishes: 214 (including Independent Chapels:37)
Priests: 294

References

Jacobite Syrian Christian Church
Dioceses in Kerala
Churches in Ernakulam district